Ten Airways was a Romanian charter airline that launched operations in 2009, as a successor of JeTran Air. They operated two MD-82s and three MD-83s The Airline was owned by Ovidiu Tender. In 2015 the airline ceased all operations.

Fleet
The Ten Airways fleet comprised the following aircraft (as of August 2016):

See also
 Fly Romania

References

External links
 Official website

Defunct airlines of Romania
Airlines established in 2009
Airlines disestablished in 2015
Romanian companies established in 2009
2015 disestablishments in Romania